Pitambar Dvija (1455-1533) was 15 and 16th century litterateur from Lower Assam and contemporary of likes of Haribara Vipra and Hema Saraswati.

Works
Usha-Parinaya was written in 1533 AD by Pitambar Dvija which was an Kamrupi rendering of the Usha-Anuradha episode from Vishnu Purana.
He composed verses on Rukmini Haran.

See also
 Ananta Kandali
 Bhusana Dvija

References

Kamrupi poets
Indian male poets
15th-century Indian poets
16th-century Indian poets
1455 births
1533 deaths